Ryan James Glasgow (born September 30, 1993) is a former American football defensive tackle. He played college football at Michigan.

College career
Glasgow played in 45 games at defensive tackle for the Wolverines, starting 33, and recorded 91 tackles, 18.5 for loss, and five sacks. Following the 2016 season, Glasgow was named to the All-Big Ten defensive second-team by both coaches and the media.

Professional career

Cincinnati Bengals
Glasgow was drafted by the Cincinnati Bengals in the fourth round, 138th overall, in the 2017 NFL Draft.

In Week 3 of the 2018 season, Glasgow was carted to the locker room with an apparent knee injury. The next day, he was diagnosed with a torn ACL and was ruled out for the rest of the season.

On October 30, 2019, Glasgow was placed on injured reserve with a knee injury.

On July 28, 2020, Glasgow was waived by the Bengals with a failed physical designation.

Houston Texans
On September 28, 2020, Glasgow was signed to the Houston Texans practice squad. He was released on October 20.

New England Patriots
On November 4, 2020, Glasgow was signed to the New England Patriots practice squad. Glasgow was released by the Patriots on November 10.

New Orleans Saints
On November 17, 2020, Glasgow was signed to the New Orleans Saints practice squad. He was elevated to the active roster on November 21 and November 28 for the team's weeks 11 and 12 games against the Atlanta Falcons and Denver Broncos, and reverted to the practice squad after each game. On January 18, 2021, Glasgow signed a reserve/futures contract with the Saints. He announced his retirement from the NFL on August 7, 2021.

Personal life
Glasgow's older brother, Graham, is a center for the Denver Broncos, while his younger brother, Jordan, was a linebacker for the Indianapolis Colts.

References

External links
Michigan Wolverines bio 

1993 births
American football defensive tackles
Cincinnati Bengals players
Houston Texans players
Living people
Michigan Wolverines football players
New England Patriots players
New Orleans Saints players
Players of American football from Illinois
Sportspeople from Aurora, Illinois
Ed Block Courage Award recipients